Longitarsus longiseta is a species of beetle in the subfamily Galerucinae that can be found everywhere in European countries such as Austria, the Baltic states, Benelux, Great Britain, Germany, Hungary, Italy, Liechtenstein, Poland, Romania, Russia, Slovakia, Slovenia, Spain, Switzerland, and Scandinavia (except for Denmark).

References

longiseta
Beetles described in 1889
Beetles of Europe
Taxa named by Julius Weise